Empress Wucheng may refer to two contemporaries:

Empress Dowager Hu (Northern Qi) (died after 581), wife of Emperor Wucheng
Empress Ashina (551–582), empress of Northern Zhou